Guiraut d'Espanha ( or de Tholoza (fl. 1245–1265) was of the last generation of troubadours, working in Provence at the court of Charles of Anjou and Countess Beatrice. Many of his poems were addressed to Beatrice. Guiraut was either from Spain or Toulouse—the manuscripts differ—but ten of his dansas, a pastorela, and a baladeta survive. One of his dansas, Ben volgra s'esser poges, survives with a melody. It begins:

And ends:

He also wrote Per amor soi gai.

Sources

Aubrey, Elizabeth. The Music of the Troubadours. Indiana University Press, 1996. .

Notes

13th-century French troubadours
People from Provence
Year of birth unknown
Year of death unknown